Le tartuffe is a 1984 French comedy film directed by and starring Gérard Depardieu based on the play Tartuffe by Molière. It was screened in the Un Certain Regard section at the 1984 Cannes Film Festival.

Cast
 Gérard Depardieu as Tartuffe
 François Périer as Orgon
 Yveline Ailhaud as Dorine
 Paule Annen as Madame Pernelle
 Paul Bru as Un exempts
 Elisabeth Depardieu as Elmire
 Dominique Ducos as Flipote
 Noureddine El Ati as Laurent
 Bernard Freyd as Cleante
 Hélène Lapiower as Marianne
 Jean-Marc Roulot as Valère
 Jean Schmitt as Monsieur Loyal
 André Wilms as Damis

References

External links

1984 films
1984 comedy films
French comedy films
1980s French-language films
Films based on works by Molière
French films based on plays
Films directed by Gérard Depardieu
Films produced by Margaret Ménégoz
Works based on Tartuffe
1980s French films